Chiaravalle is the Italian name for Clairvaux. It may also refer to:

Places
 Chiaravalle, a district of Milan, Italy
 Chiaravalle Abbey: Cistercian abbey in the eponymous district of Milan
 Chiaravalle Centrale, a town in the province of Catanzaro
 Chiaravalle, Marche, a comune (municipality) in the Province of Ancona in the Italian region Marche

People
Bernie Chiaravalle (born 1953), American guitarist and singer-songwriter
Francesco da Chiaravalle (died 1450), Roman Catholic bishop